The State Guard Association of the United States (SGAUS) is a non-profit organization advocating for the advancement and support of regulated state military forces, as established by state governments under the authority of federal law. The SGAUS encourages the establishment and advancement of regulated state forces through lobbying and affiliation with independent state associations. There were twenty-two independent SGAUS recognized state associations in 2008. State associations are separate entities—typically 501(c)(3) corporations—and are not components of the SGAUS corporation, the SGAUS Foundation, or the respective states.  When petitioned, the SGAUS recognizes lawful, state-level associations with twenty-five or more members who are seeking to establish state defense forces.

History of SDFs and SGAUS
From its founding until the early 1900s, the United States maintained only a minimal army and relied on state militias to supply the majority of its troops. In 1903, the predecessor to the modern-day National Guard was formed to augment the militia and Regular Army with a federally controlled reserve force.  In 1933, Congress finalized the split between the National Guard and the state defense forces by mandating that all federally funded soldiers take a dual enlistment/commission and thus enter both the state National Guard and the National Guard of the United States (a branch of the federal reserves). This division forced states to maintain both a National Guard and a state defense force if they desired to have non-federal soldiers. During World War II, much of the National Guard was deployed on federal duty. Many states continued to maintain distinct state militias (some building on ones that never ceased to exist) to defend their own territories and shorelines. In the 1980s, many state defense forces  began to be reformed and activated. As a result, the State Defense Force Association of the United States was formed in 1985. The name was later changed in 1993 to the State Guard Association of the United States. As of 2020, the SGAUS has members from eighteen states and territories.

SGAUS Foundation, Inc.

In 2006, the SGAUS Board of Directors created the SGAUS Foundation as an independent 501(c)(3) non-profit organization to focus on education, public awareness, and outreach programs that support the advancement and support of regulated state defense forces. A current list of SGAUS foundation officers can be found on the SGAUS website's Leadership page.

Training and certification programs
The SGAUS offers various certification programs for its members.

Military Emergency Management Specialist program

The SGAUS Military Emergency Management Specialist (MEMS) program was created in 1998.  The program is structured around the Federal Emergency Management Agency's National Incident Management System (NIMS) and Incident Command System (ICS).  The MEMS program curriculum includes online Federal Emergency Management Agency (FEMA) NIMS and ICS courses offered free of charge through FEMA's Emergency Management Institute's (EMI) Independent Study Program.  In addition to online FEMA courses, students are required to complete operational practicums that incorporate the learning objectives of the online FEMA courses.

The MEMS Academy curricula are based on the idea of developing areas of common knowledge required at different levels of responsibility in emergency response and use accepted, validated courses available throughout the nation.  The principle behind the several MEMS curricula is that individuals with Basic MEMS qualification will have operational understanding of the principles of emergency management, including mitigation, preparedness, emergency response and recovery and have knowledge, skills and abilities needed to effectively work within a comprehensive emergency management operation.  Those with Senior and Master level qualification will be able to lead and plan incident response efforts of increasing complexity.

Certification in the MEMS program consists of three levels: basic, senior, and master, with traditional military style badges awarded to students upon completion of each level.  In addition to the badges, those students who participate in operational missions may be awarded a distinctive flash, which is worn behind the badge.

For a short time, there was a MEMS Command and Staff College operated by the SGAUS. Students who successfully completed this program were awarded the MEMS Command and Staff College Unit Citation.

Chaplain’s School and College

The SGAUS Chaplain School and College provides materials of study, discussion forums, and classroom training related to field of military chaplaincy for state defense force chaplains and chaplain assistants.

Engineer Specialty Qualification Identification Designation (ESQiD)

The SGAUS Engineer Specialty Qualification Identification Program (ESQiD) was created in 2015, to provide state guard forces with a means of identifying soldiers as qualified in those engineering skills needed during state emergencies.  The program was structured with the Federal Emergency Management Agency’s National Incident Management Structure (NIMS) and included online Federal Emergency Management Agency (FEMA) NIMS and Independent Course Study (ICS) Courses offered free of charge through FEMA’s Emergency Management Institute (EMI) Independent Study Program.

Prerequisites for entry into the ESQiD Program include active membership in a sponsoring state defense force, medical clearance, completion of SDF Basic Military Training, and completion of the Military Emergency Management Specialist-Basic program.

Engineer Common Skills Training includes Land Navigation, Field Sanitation, Job Site Safety Courses, field communications with SDF utilized communications equipment, and Hazardous materials awareness.

Engineer Specific Skill Training includes completion of several FEMA training courses and SDF training courses based upon the SDF Engineer Unit Mission Essential Training List (METL).  Each state develops its own specific Engineer METL and the courses required to qualify an engineer candidate for designation as an Engineer.  The Engineer METL is a primary part of the development of the list of qualification training courses designed to produce an Engineer capable of working on typical disasters and emergencies with practical engineering knowledge in that state.  The final part of the examination process is a field practicum involving engineering activities in high stress environments, followed by an Oral Review Board.  Upon successful completion of all aspects the State Director of Engineer Training approves the award of the Engineer Specialty Qualification Badge, in either Gold or Silver.  Each state sets their own standards for use of either the Gold Engineer Badge, the Silver Engineer Badge, or both badges.  A black badge is also authorized, for wear on subdued combat uniforms by either holders of the gold or silver badge.

Follow up training is often conducted to keep the Engineer soldier up to date on the latest problem solving solutions.  Persons with heavy construction experience such as erecting multi-story buildings, constructing roads and bridges, and so forth, are of great value to the Engineer unit.

Awards

Legislative efforts
The organization has supported several legislative efforts related to the establishment or support of state defense forces :
(dead) HR 206 State Defense Force Improvement Act, 2009, 111th Congress
(removed by committee) HR 5658 Duncan Hunter National Defense Authorization Act FY09, 2008, 110th Congress
(dead) HR 826 State Defense Force Improvement Act, 2007, 110th Congress
(dead) HR 3401 State Defense Force Improvement Act, 2005, 109th Congress
(dead) HR 2797 State Defense Force Improvement Act, 2003, 108th Congress

Member State information

References

United States military associations
+